Penguin Group is a British trade book publisher and part of Penguin Random House, which is owned by the German media conglomerate Bertelsmann. The new company was created by a merger that was finalised on 1 July 2013, with Bertelsmann initially owning 53% of the joint venture, and Pearson PLC initially owning the remaining 47%. Since 18 December 2019, Penguin Random House has been wholly owned by Bertelsmann.

Penguin Books has its registered office in City of Westminster, London.

Its British division is Penguin Books Ltd. Other separate divisions are located in the United States, Ireland, New Zealand, India, Australia, Canada, China, Brazil and South Africa.

History
Penguin Books Ltd. (est. 1935) of the United Kingdom was bought by Pearson Longman in 1970. In 1975, Penguin acquired the American hardcover firm Viking Press. In 1986, Penguin acquired the New American Library, a mass-market paperback publisher. In 1995, Penguin acquired the independent publisher Donald I. Fine.

Penguin Group (USA) Inc. was formed in 1996 as a result of the merger between Penguin Books USA and the Putnam Berkley Group after Penguin acquired Putnam Berkley from MCA. The newly formed company was originally called Penguin Putnam Inc., but, in 2003, it changed its name to Penguin Group (USA) Inc. to reflect the parent Pearson PLC's grouping of all the Penguin companies worldwide under the supervisory umbrella of Pearson's own Penguin Group division.

The different Penguin companies use many imprints, many of which used to be independent publishers. Penguin Group (USA) Inc. also operates its own speaker's bureau that books speaking engagements for many of the publisher's authors. In 2011, the online writing and publishing community Book Country was launched as a subsidiary of Penguin Group USA.

On 11 April 2012, the United States Department of Justice filed United States v. Apple Inc., naming Apple, Penguin, and four other major publishers as defendants.  The suit alleged that they conspired to fix prices for e-books and weaken Amazon.com's position in the market in violation of antitrust law. In December 2013, a federal judge approved a settlement of the antitrust claims, in which Penguin and the other publishers paid into a fund that provided credits to customers who had overpaid for books due to the price-fixing.

On 26 October 2012, Pearson entered into talks with rival conglomerate Bertelsmann, over the possibility of combining their respective publishing companies, Penguin Group and Random House. The houses were considered two of the 'Big Six' publishing companies prior to the merger, which became the 'Big Five' upon its completion. The European Union approved the Penguin Random House merger on 5 April 2013.

Imprints
Penguin Group imprints include the following:

See also 
 The other 'Big Five' English-language book publishers:
 Hachette, Holtzbrinck/Macmillan, HarperCollins and Simon & Schuster
 Amazon Breakthrough Novel Award
 Pearson Education
 Penguin Group (USA) Inc. v. American Buddha

References

External links 
 

Book publishing companies based in London
Publishing companies established in 1935
British companies established in 1935
1935 establishments in England
Bertelsmann subsidiaries
Penguin Random House

de:Penguin (Verlag)